Yu Tianzhu (born 5 December 1989) is a Chinese former footballer.

Club career
Yu Tianzhu would play for the Beijing Guoan youth team before he was loaned to Beijing Guoan's satellite team Beijing Guoan Talent, which would play as a foreign team in Singapore's S.League in 2010. On his return to China he would join second tier club Guizhou Zhicheng, however in his debut season he would be part of the squad that was relegated at the end of the 2011 China League One campaign. He would join third tier club Hebei Zhongji the following season.

Yu would return to Guizhou and was part of the team that gained promotion to the second tier at the end of the 2014 China League Two campaign. While he was at Guizhou he would be a peripheral member of the team and would join lower league side Shenzhen Baoxin on a free transfer before joining third tier club Hunan Billows.

Career statistics
Statistics accurate as of match played 31 December 2020.

References

External links

1989 births
Living people
Chinese footballers
Association football defenders
Singapore Premier League players
China League One players
Hebei F.C. players
Guizhou F.C. players
Hunan Billows players